Wrightia is a genus of flowering plants in the family Apocynaceae, first described as a genus in 1810. It native to tropical Africa, China, the Indian Subcontinent, Southeast Asia, Papuasia, and Australia. The species are all small trees or shrubs.

The genus was named for William Wright (1735-1819), Scottish physician and botanist, by Robert Brown.

Wrightia antidysenterica has long been known in Indian Ayurvedic tradition, and is called "kuţaja" in Sanskrit.

Species

formerly included

References

External links

 
Apocynaceae genera